Leschi can refer to:
Chief Leschi, Chief of the Nisqually tribe of Native Americans
Leschi, Seattle, Washington, neighborhood of Seattle, Washington
Chief Leschi School, tribal school in the Puyallup Valley near Mount Rainier in Washington
Leschi (steam ferry), a steam ferry that operated on Lake Washington from 1913 to 1950, and afterwards on Puget Sound until 1967
Leschi (fireboat)